Victor Mbarika is an American professor from Cameroon. He  is currently the Stallings International Distinguished Scholar and MIS professor at East Carolina University within the University of North Carolina System, in Greenville, North Carolina, United States. He is the President, Board of Trustees of the ICT University.

Education
Mbarika earned his Master's degree in Management Information Systems (MIS) from The University of Illinois at Chicago in 1997, and a Ph.D. degree in MIS from Auburn University in 2000.

Career and research
Mbarika's research is focused on ICT implementation in Africa, and has provided a theoretically informed framework for understanding ICTs in less developed countries. His work provides a base from which to begin to understand the contextual differences that dictate information systems research in less advantaged environments. He is founding editor-in-chief of The African Journal of Information Systems and senior board member for several academic journals internationally.

He is also the founder of the International Center for Information Technology and Development (ICITD), East Carolina University, Greenville, which focuses on advancing IT training and development in Sub Saharan Africa especially on e-health, e-education and e-democracy. In 2016, he was among the first recipients of the Fulbright-MCMC research grants.

In 2020, Premium Times reported that a spokesperson for Abdullahi Umar Ganduje, governor of Kano State of Nigeria, claimed that Ganduje had received a letter from Mbarika indicating Ganduje's appointment as a visiting professor at East Carolina University. East Carolina University later released a statement that confirmed Mbarika was part of its faculty but denied that the appointment was made and that Mbarika was authorised to make such an appointment at the university.

Other initiatives
Other initiatives facilitated by him include The ICT for Africa conference series (ICT4 Africa), African Journal of Information Systems (AJIS), the ICT University Foundation and Cameroon Youths for Jesus (CYJ). Through the ICT University Foundation, he has donated e-learning facilities to some universities in sub-Saharan Africa which is aimed to advance learning activities for economic and societal development.

Publications
Professor Mbarika has authored over 200 academic publications (books, book chapters, journals articles).

Selected books
 Ayo, C. K. and Mbarika, V. (Eds.). (2017). Sustainable ICT Adoption and Integration for Socio-Economic Development. IGI Global, Hershey, Pennsylvania, USA.
 Mbarika, V. and Adebayo, A. P. (2015). Information and Communication Technology for Secondary Schools. AGWECAMS Publishers.
 Kituyi G., Moya, M. and Mbarika, V. (2013). Computerized Accounting and Finance: Applications in Business. Makerere University Business School.
 Hinson, R., Boateng, R. and Mbarika, V. (Eds.). (2009). Electronic Commerce and Customer Management in Ghana. Accra, Ghana: Pro Write Publishing.
 Kizza, J.M., Muhirwe, J., Aisbett, J., Getao, K., Mbarika, V., Patel, D. and Rodrigues, A. J. (Eds.). (2007). Strengthening the Role of ICT in Development. Fountain Publishers: Kampala, Uganda.
 Sankar, C.S., Mbarika, V., & Raju, P.K. (2006). Use of Information Technologies in Businesses and Society: Learning Through Real-World Case Studies. Anderson, SC: Tavenner Publishers.
 Raju, P.K., Sankar, C. & Mbarika, V. (2005). POWERTEL Case Study: Coverage of a Larger Area versus Better Frequency Re-Use in Wireless Communications. Anderson, SC: Tavenner Publishers.
 Mbarika, V. (2001). Africa’s Least Developed Countries’ Teledensity Problems and Strategies. Yaounde, Cameroon: ME & Agwecam Publishers.

Honors and awards
Mbarika is a recipient of three lifetime achievement awards, for his "Outstanding contribution to computer science and telecommunications" and his "Contribution to ICT Research and Education".

References

External links 
 ICITD

American scientists
20th-century American scientists
Auburn University alumni
Cameroonian scientists
Information systems researchers
Living people
Year of birth missing (living people)